Buckland Airport  is a state-owned public-use airport located one nautical mile (1.85 km) southwest of the central business district of Buckland, a city in the Northwest Arctic Borough of the U.S. state of Alaska. The airport is situated on the Buckland River.

Although most U.S. airports use the same three-letter location identifier for the FAA and IATA, this airport is assigned BVK by the FAA and BKC by the IATA (which assigned BVK to Huacaraje, Bolivia). The airport's ICAO identifier is PABL.

Facilities and aircraft 
It has one runway designated 11/29 with a gravel surface measuring 3,200 by 75 feet (975 x 23 m).

Airlines and destinations 

Prior to its bankruptcy and cessation of all operations, Ravn Alaska served the airport from multiple locations. As of January 2022, Ravn has not reintroduced services.

References

External links 
 FAA Alaska airport diagram (GIF)
 

Airports in Northwest Arctic Borough, Alaska